Maksym Khlan (born 27 January 2003) is a Ukrainian professional footballer who plays as a midfielder for FC Zorya Luhansk.

Career
Born in Zhytomyr, Khlan moved to the Karpaty Lviv academy system after a short time in FC Dynamo Kyiv's system.

On 27 June 2020, he made his Ukrainian Premier League debut for FC Karpaty Lviv as a second-half substitute in the home derby match against FC Lviv. In January 2021, he signed a contract with FC Zorya Luhansk, another Ukrainian Premier League club.

References

External links
Profile at UAF Official Site (Ukr)

2003 births
Living people
Footballers from Zhytomyr
Sportspeople from Zhytomyr Oblast
Ukrainian footballers
Ukrainian Premier League players
FC Karpaty Lviv players
FC Zorya Luhansk players
Association football midfielders
Ukraine youth international footballers
Ukraine under-21 international footballers